Valdéz (frequently also called Limones) is a town in the Esmeraldas province of Ecuador. It is the seat of the Eloy Alfaro Canton.

Sources 

World-Gazetteer.com

Populated places in Esmeraldas Province